Paweł Tadeusz Howard Abbott (born 5 May 1982) is a professional footballer who played as a striker.

Club career

Early career
Abbott was born in York, North Yorkshire to a Polish mother and an English father as the younger of two children. He first played football for Beagle Boys in York before the team changed its name to York RI. He had the chance to play for Doncaster Rovers but declined the offer and moved to Poland, where he became a youth player at ŁKS Łódź, before moving back to England to join Preston North End at the age of 19.

He did not have the best time at Preston making only 25 appearances in three years and having two loan spells at Bury.

Huddersfield Town
In early 2004, Abbott was signed on loan by Huddersfield Town as a makeshift replacement for Jon Stead who had just been sold to Premier League side Blackburn Rovers. He scored on his debut after coming off the bench against Bristol Rovers, going on to score four times in six games on loan. He was then bought for a fee of around £125,000. He would score only once more that season, but in 2004/05 became the first Town striker in 6 years to hit more than 20 goals as he struck 27 times in all competitions.

The following season was less successful for Abbott. After an initial run of scoring in the season, including in six consecutive games in August and September, he suffered something of a goal-drought over the remainder of the campaign, being relegated to being a bit-part player from the bench following this loss of form. He scored a total of 14 times in 2005/06.

In July 2006, Abbott rejected a move to Milton Keynes Dons as part of a deal or no deal with their defender Dean Lewington. He said that he wanted to fight for a first-team place against Gary Taylor-Fletcher, Andy Booth, John McAliskey and new signing Luke Beckett. In his penultimate game for Huddersfield on 30 December 2006 he scored two goals (including a last minute winner) against the club he would ironically go on to join in a matter of days; Swansea City. In his final game for Huddersfield he was sent off against Doncaster Rovers on 1 January 2007.

Swansea City
In January 2007, Abbott was sold to Swansea City for £150,000. He made his debut as a late substitute against Gillingham on 23 January 2007. Abbott was signed by Kenny Jackett, however shortly after he joined the club Jackett was replaced by Roberto Martínez. After 18 league appearances (9 starts) for the Swans he scored just once against Rotherham United, which was Martínez's first game in charge.

Darlington
After just 6 months with Swansea, Abbott joined Darlington for £100,000. Here Abbott found some of his best form scoring 17 from in 31 appearances. However, he was prone to injuries during his two seasons there and was sold to Oldham Athletic.

Oldham Athletic
On 26 June 2009, Abbott signed for League One team Oldham Athletic on a two-year deal. He scored his first two goals for the club on 15 August 2009, wrapping up a 2–1 victory for Oldham against Leyton Orient. Abbott finished the season as Oldham's top scorer with 13 goals.

Charlton Athletic
On 30 July 2010, Abbott signed for Charlton Athletic for a fee of £20,000. Abbott netted twice against Shrewsbury Town in the League Cup to register his first goals for the club. He went on to score against MK Dons in the Football League Trophy and Swindon in the league, ending his season tally on 4 goals.

Ruch Chorzów
On 28 February 2011, Abbott joined Polish side Ruch Chorzów on a free transfer, after playing 25 matches for Charlton scoring four goals.

On 30 July 2011 he scored his first goal for Ruch Chorzów, giving his team a 2–1 victory over GKS Bełchatów on the first day match of the 2011-12 season.

International career
Abbott was eligible to represent both England and Poland at International level, and chose to represent Poland due to his mother. He made one appearance for the Poland national under-21 team, where he also scored his first international goal.

Career statistics

Honours
Arka Gdynia
 Polish Cup (1): 2016–17
 I liga (1): 2015–16

Zawisza Bydgoszcz
 Polish Cup (1): 2013–14
 I liga (1): 2012–13

References

External links
 

1982 births
Living people
Footballers from York
English footballers
Polish footballers
English people of Polish descent
Polish people of English descent
Citizens of Poland through descent
Poland under-21 international footballers
Association football forwards
ŁKS Łódź players
Preston North End F.C. players
Bury F.C. players
Huddersfield Town A.F.C. players
Swansea City A.F.C. players
Darlington F.C. players
Oldham Athletic A.F.C. players
Charlton Athletic F.C. players
Ruch Chorzów players
Zawisza Bydgoszcz players
Arka Gdynia players
OKS Stomil Olsztyn players
Ekstraklasa players
English Football League players